Troels "Dex" Rusel (born 12 February 1964) is a Danish former professional darts player.

Darts career 

Rusel made one appearance in the BDO World Darts Championship in 1994, where he beat Alan Brown and Ian Sarfas to reach the quarter finals, losing to Ronnie Sharp. Rusel was previously a quarter-finalist in the 1989 Winmau World Masters where he beat Alan Warriner in the second round before losing to Eric Bristow,. He also reached the final of the 1993 WDF World Cup men's singles, losing to Roland Scholten.

Rusel tried a semi comeback in the 2013 Denmark Open, but with very little success, losing in the first round.

World Championship results

BDO 
 1994: Quarter Finals: (lost to Ronnie Sharp 1–4) (sets)

Career finals

WDF major finals: 1 (1 runner-up)

References

External links 
Profile and stats on Darts Database

Danish darts players
Living people
1964 births
British Darts Organisation players
Sportspeople from Copenhagen